Scientology has operated in Belgium since 1972, but the organization has encountered difficulties there in recent years.

Status of Scientology in Belgium
Belgium only officially recognizes six religions: Roman Catholicism, Protestantism, Anglicanism, the Eastern Orthodox Church, Judaism and Islam.

Scientology opened an international office in 2003 near the European Union headquarters to lobby for recognition as an official religious group.

2007 trial proposal

In 1997, Belgian authorities began investigating the practices and finances of the Church of Scientology in Belgium after ex-Scientologists said they had been subjected to intimidation and extortion. Concluding the ten-year investigation, on September 4, 2007, a Belgian prosecutor recommended that 12 persons associated with Scientology and two legal entities – the Belgian Church of Scientology and Scientology's Office of Human Rights – should be prosecuted on counts of extortion, fraud, organized crime, obstruction of medical practice, illegal medical practice, invasion of privacy, conspiracy and commercial infractions like abusive contractual clauses. An administrative court would decide if the case would go ahead and charges would be pressed. The court's decision was expected to be announced within a few months.

U.S. State Department response

Belgium and other European countries have been criticized by the U.S. State Department for ruling that Scientology was a cult or sect and enacting restrictive laws against it.

In response to the proposed trial, the U.S. State Department said that if Belgian authorities "have evidence that individuals violated Belgian law, they should take appropriate legal steps consistent with Belgium’s international obligations to protect freedom of thought, conscience and religion"; however, the State Department would "oppose any effort to stigmatize an entire group based solely upon religious beliefs and would be concerned over infringement of any individual’s rights because of religious affiliation."

Church of Scientology response
The Associated Press reported an official statement released by the Church of Scientology on September 4, 2007:

"For the last 10 years, the prosecutor has been using the media, trying to damage the reputation of the Church of Scientology and not being able to put a case in court," Scientology said. "As a consequence, this created a climate of intolerance and discrimination" in Belgium.

The Church added that the prosecutor's recommendations suggested Scientology was guilty even before a court could hear the charges, making it "difficult for the Church of Scientology to recover and properly defend (itself) before the court."

2015 trial
In October 2015, a criminal trial started against twelve leaders of Scientology in Belgium. Charges against them were bribery, extortion, fraud, violation of the privacy and unlicensed practicing of medicine.

Acquittal

In March 2016, the Church of Scientology was acquitted of all charges, and demands to close its Belgian branch and European headquarters were dismissed. The presiding judge, Yves Regimont, cited prejudice in the investigators and said that the church had been “unfairly hounded for years by Belgian authorities,” according to a report by ABC. “The entire proceedings are declared inadmissible for a serious and irremediable breach of the right to a fair trial. The defendants were prosecuted primarily because they were Scientologists,” the judge said.

In April 2016, the Belgian prosecutors failed to appeal.

See also 

Scientology status by country
Timeline of Scientology
Scientology controversies

References

Further reading

Belgium, Scientology and
Religion in Belgium